Arthur Chickering may refer to:

 Arthur M. Chickering (1887–1974), American arachnologist
 Arthur W. Chickering (died 2020), educational researcher in the field of student affairs